Bright Side of Life is the second album by reggae/rock group Rebelution. It was released on August 4, 2009, under Controlled Substance Sound Labs.

Track listing

Change The System is a re-recorded version of the song from their 2006 EP Rebelution.

Credits
Performers
Eric Rachmany - Lead and Backing Vocals, Electric and Acoustic Guitar
Rory Carey - Keyboards, Grand Piano, Hammond B3 Organ, Rhodes Piano
Wesley Finley - Drums, Percussion, Backing Vocals
Marley D. Williams - Bass Guitar
Jeff Elliot - Saxophone
Craig Thomas - Trumpet
Additional Credits
Recording Engineer - Gene Cornelius
Mixed and Mastered - Jim Fox
Dub effects - Donovan Haney, Jim Fox and Rebelution
Art and Design - Abel Aquino

Reviews
Allmusic

References

2009 albums
Rebelution (band) albums